Ewins is a surname. Notable people with the surname include:

Brett Ewins (1955–2015), British comic book artist
David Ewins (1942–2023), British mechanical engineer
Mat Ewins, British actor, writer, and stand-up comedian

See also
Ewin
Ewing (surname)